Brian Morton (born 1955) is an American author of five works of fiction and one memoir.  He currently teaches at Sarah Lawrence College, New York University and The Bennington Writing Seminars.

Morton's 1998 novel Starting Out in the Evening was adapted into the 2007 film of the same name.  His 2006 novel Breakable You was adapted into the 2017 film of the same name.

Early life and education 
Morton was born and raised in Teaneck, New Jersey, where he attended Teaneck High School. His father was an Irish-Catholic and a union organizer, and his mother was Jewish, and a school teacher. His mother was from a family of artists. Her brother was a composer, and her father (Morton's grandfather) was an actor in Yiddish theater. He has an older sister who wrote stories as a child.

He graduated from Sarah Lawrence College in 1978.

Career 
In 1984, a few months after his father died, Morton began to write a portrait of him. The character of Francis Xavier Burke of The Dylanist is an idealized version of his father. In 1988 he finished the book. In 1988 he was working as a co-editor for the book review of the magazine Dissent, where he became executive editor in 1995. Through his connections at Dissent, Morton found Harvey Klinger as an agent who loved the book. Ted Solotaroff at HarperCollins purchased the book, which received critical praise. In the following decades, Morton wrote four additional works of fiction. In 2022, Morton published Tasha: A Son's Memoir, which chronicles his complex relationship with his mother, whose worsening dementia caused her health to decline.

Books
Morton has received a great deal of praise for his fiction.

Of The Dylanist, Carolyn See wrote in The Los Angeles Times: "How hard it is to write about a wonderful book where nothing 'happens' except precious life. All I can say is: This is one to buy, to read. It echoes in the brain, as your own life unfolds."

Writing in Newsday, Charles Taylor called Starting Out in the Evening "the kind of book that gets you reading novels in the first place What seems more important is that, finally, it’s the kind of book that keeps you reading novels."

Reviewing A Window Across the River in the Palm Beach Post, Scott Eyman wrote: "Brian Morton is some strange kind of magician; his novels have the luminous transparency of a great city at twilight. The vocabulary is basic, but the emotions aren't; the people are artists, but the questions they ponder which is more important, our responsibility to ourselves or to the people we love? are universal."

In his appraisal of Breakable You in The Chicago Tribune, Art Winslow noted: " One thing Morton is to be complimented on is the honesty of the emotional complex he builds into his characters, in which no set of feelings escapes being alloyed with elements of its opposite."

Kirkus Reviews summed up its notice of Florence Gordon by saying: "Always a pleasure to read for his well-drawn characters, quiet insight and dialogue that crackles with wit, Morton here raises his own bar in all three areas. He also joins a sadly small club of male writers who have created memorable heroines."

The Dylanist (1991)
Starting Out in the Evening (1998)
A Window Across the River (2003)
Breakable You (2006)
Florence Gordon (2014)
Tasha: A Son's Memoir (2022)

Awards

Starting Out in the Evening received the Academy Award in Literature from the American Academy of Arts and Letters, the Koret Jewish Book Award for Fiction, and the Guggenheim Foundation Award.  It was also a finalist for the PEN/Faulkner Award.
A Window Across the River was chosen as a bookclub selection for The Today Show.

Personal life 
Morton lives with his partner Heather Harpham a drama teacher, performer and author of a memoir, Happiness: The Crooked Little Road to Semi-Ever After. Together they have a daughter, Gracie-Amelia, and a son, Gabriel.

References

External links
Publishers Weekly: Tales of Love and Art in the World
 
 Review of Starting Out in the Evening at The Occasional Review

20th-century American novelists
21st-century American novelists
American male novelists
1955 births
Living people
Teaneck High School alumni
Writers from New York City
Novelists from New Jersey
Sarah Lawrence College alumni
Sarah Lawrence College faculty
New York University faculty
PEN/Faulkner Award for Fiction winners
20th-century American male writers
21st-century American male writers
Novelists from New York (state)